The Darbar Festival is an Indian classical music and dance festival that takes place annually over three months in London. It uniquely curates music from the north Indian Hindustani and south Indian Carnatic classical traditions as well as dhrupad and percussion.

The Darbar Festival is the flagship event of the Darbar Arts Culture Heritage Trust, a UK registered non-profit. The organization exists to promote greater access to Indian classical music and dance and to ensure this art form can be accessed by a global audience. It does this through its YouTube channel and social media platforms. Another element of Darbar's work is to support a new generation of aspiring artists through summer workshops for new artists, an Indian music appreciation course and Indian music classes for primary school children in Leicester.

The festival
The festival features great masters and emerging musicians artists like Ustad Amjad Ali Khan, Shahid Parvez, Pandits Rajan & Sajan Mishra, Shubha Mudgal, Aruna Sairam, Sanjay Subrahmanyan, Niladri Kumar, Rakesh Chaurasia, Kaushiki Chakraborty, Ronu Majumdar, Pandit Jasraj, Pandit Venkatesh Kumar, Pandit Ulhas Kashalkar, Kala Ramnath, Prabha Atre, Sudha Ragunathan and Roopa Panesar.

History
The Darbar Festival started in 2005 as a one-off tribute to the energy, dedication and enthusiasm of Bhai Gurmeet Singh Ji Virdee (1937–2005); a well loved tabla teacher from Leicester. The festival continues today and aims to reflect the values that Bhai Gurmeet Singh Virdee put into his passions - his Sikh faith, photography, music and tabla.

Previous Darbar Festivals:

2006 Peepul Centre, Leicester 
2007 Phoenix, Leicester 
2008 Phoenix, Leicester 
2009 Southbank Centre, London 
2010 Kings Place, London 
2011 Kings Place, London
2012 Southbank centre, London
2013 Southbank centre, London
2014 Southbank centre, London
2015 Southbank centre, London
2016 Southbank centre, London
2017 Southbank Centre, Barbican Centre & Sadlers Well's
2018 Southbank Centre, Barbican Centre & Sadlers Well's

References

Music festivals in London
Indian classical music